Filippo Grasso (born 15 November 1947) is an Italian boxer. He competed in the men's flyweight event at the 1968 Summer Olympics.

References

1947 births
Living people
Italian male boxers
Olympic boxers of Italy
Boxers at the 1968 Summer Olympics
Sportspeople from the Province of Enna
Flyweight boxers
20th-century Italian people